The Judo competition at the 2010 Central American and Caribbean Games was being held in Mayagüez, Puerto Rico.

The tournament was scheduled to be held from 18 to 21 July at the Aguada Coliseum in Aguada.

Medal summary

Men's events

Women's events

References

External links

Events at the 2010 Central American and Caribbean Games
Central American and Caribbean Games
2010
Judo competitions in Puerto Rico